The American Society of Architectural Illustrators (ASAI), is a professional organization representing the business and artistic interests of architectural illustrators throughout North America and around the world. ASAI’s principal mandate is to foster of communication and networking among its members, raise the standards of architectural drawing, and bring awareness to the general public of this type of work and the value of their drawings as a conceptual and representational tool in architecture.

History 
The office for the ASAI moved from California to Maine in 2013. 

A new website and logo debuted in 2016.

Architecture in Perspective 
Architecture In Perspective (AIP) is an international architectural competition that  architectural representations for publications and exhibition. Architecture In Perspective is launched each year at the ASAI's annual convention. The Society's highest award, the Hugh Ferriss Memorial Prize is awarded each year in recognition of excellence in the graphic representation of architecture.

Affiliations and advocacy 
The ASAI has worked to establish an international network of delineators throughout the US, Canada, England, Europe, Japan, Australia, Korea, and other countries. Membership with the ASAI brings official affiliations with:
 Australian Association of Architectural Illustrators
 Japan Architectural Renderers Association
 Korean Architectural Perspectivists Association
 The American Institute of Architects
 The Architectural Society of China
 The New York Society of Renderers
 Society of Architectural Illustrators, United Kingdom
 Philippine Association of Architectural Renderers
 Design Communication Association, United States

In 2007, The American Society of Illustrators Partnership (ASIP) was established, with ASAI as one of the six founding organizations. The primary stated purpose of the ASIP was to educate its members and others regarding the rights of illustrators to receive royalties and licensing fees for the use of their work. Other member organizations of ASIP currently include:
 Illustrators Partnership of America
 Association of Medical Illustrators
 National Cartoonists Society
 Guild of Natural Science Illustrators
 San Francisco Society of Illustrators
 Pittsburgh Society of Illustrators
 American Society of Aviation Artists
 Society of Illustrators of San Diego
 Society of Illustrators of Los Angeles
 Illustrators Club of Washington DC, Maryland & Virginia
 Association of American Editorial Cartoonists
 and Illustrators-at-Large who are nonaffiliated

See also
 Society of Architectural Illustrators (United Kingdom)

References

External links 

1986 establishments in California
Architectural Illustrators, American Society of
Architectural Illustrators, American Society of
Architectural Illustrators, American Society of
Arts organizations based in California
Arts organizations established in 1986
Organizations based in Maine
Architectural Illustrators, American Society of
Arts organizations based in Maine